Year 1486 (MCDLXXXVI) was a common year starting on Sunday.

Events 
 January–December 
 January 18 – King Henry VII of England and Elizabeth of York are married, uniting the House of Lancaster and the House of York, after the Wars of the Roses.
 February 16 – Archduke Maximilian I of Habsburg is elected King of the Romans at Frankfurt (crowned April 9 at Aachen).
 February 18 – Lord Chaitanya Mahaprabhu is born in the town of Nadia, West Bengal, India, just after sunset.  He is regarded as an incarnation, or avatar, of Lord Krsna, and later comes to inaugurate the sankirtana movement, or the chanting of the Holy Names of the Lord.  This chanting, or mantra meditation, is first brought to the United States in 1965, by A.C. Bhaktivedanta Swami Prabhupada.
 April 21 – The adoption of the Sentència Arbitral de Guadalupe ends the War of the Remences, in the Principality of Catalonia.

 Date unknown 
 Tízoc, Aztec ruler of Tenochtitlan, dies. Some sources suggest that he was poisoned, others that he was the victim of "sorcery" or illness. He is succeeded by his brother Āhuitzotl.
 Sigismund, Archduke of Tyrol, issues Europe's first large silver coin, the guldengroschen, which will later become the thaler.
 Giovanni Pico della Mirandola returns to Florence, and writes Oration on the Dignity of Man.
 The Medici giraffe arrives in Florence.
 Johann Reuchlin begins studying the Hebrew language.
 The first written use of the word football to describe the ball.

Births 
 January 6 – Martin Agricola, German Renaissance composer and music theorist (d. 1556)
 February 10 – George of the Palatinate, German nobleman; Bishop of Speyer (1513–1529) (d. 1529)
 February 18 – Chaitanya Mahaprabhu, Bengali ascetic and monk (d. 1534)
 July 2 – Jacopo Sansovino, Italian sculptor and architect (d. 1570)
 July 16 – Andrea del Sarto, Italian painter (d. 1530)
 July 25 – Albrecht VII, Duke of Mecklenburg (1503–1520), then Duke of Mecklenburg-Güstrow (1520–1547) (d. 1547)
 July 28 – Pieter Gillis, French philosopher (d. 1533)
 August 3 – Imperia Cognati, Italian courtesan (d. 1512)
 August 23 – Sigismund von Herberstein, Austrian diplomat and historian (d. 1566)
 September 14 – Heinrich Cornelius Agrippa, German astrologer and alchemist (d. 1535)
 September 20 – Arthur, Prince of Wales, son of Henry VII of England (d. 1502)
 October 10 – Charles III, Duke of Savoy (d. 1553)
 November 13 – Johann Eck, German Scholastic theologian and defender of Catholicism during the Protestant Reformation (d. 1543)
 December 9 – Philip III, Count of Waldeck-Eisenberg (1524–1539) (d. 1539)
 date unknown – Shimon Lavi, Sephardi kabbalist (d. 1585)
 probable
 Colin Campbell, 3rd Earl of Argyll (d. 1535)
 Gerolamo Emiliani, Venetian-born humanitarian, canonized (d. 1537)
 Ludwig Senfl, Swiss composer (d. 1542 or 1543)

Deaths 
 January 30 – Jacques of Savoy, Count of Romont, Prince of Savoy (b. 1450)
 March 11 – Albrecht III Achilles, Elector of Brandenburg (b. 1414)
 March 30 – Thomas Bourchier, Archbishop of Canterbury and Lord Chancellor of England (b. c. 1404)
 May – Louis I, Count of Montpensier (b. 1405)
 July 14 – Margaret of Denmark, Scottish queen consort, daughter of Christian I of Denmark (b. 1456)
 August (day unknown) – Marco Barbarigo, the 73rd Doge of Venice, was said to have died in a dispute caused by his brother and successor, Agostino Barbarigo.
 August 3 – Asakura Ujikage, 8th head of the Japanese Asakura clan (b. 1449)
 August 11 – William Waynflete, English Lord Chancellor and bishop of Winchester (b. c. 1398)
 August 26 – Ernest, Elector of Saxony, progenitor of the Ernestine Wettins (b. 1441)
 September 2 – Guy XIV de Laval, French noble (b. 1406)
 September 19 – Richard Oldham, English Catholic bishop
 date unknown
 Tízoc, Aztec ruler of Tenochtitlan (perhaps poisoned)
 Souvanna Banlang, Lan Xang king (b. 1455)
 probable – Aristotile Fioravanti, Italian architect and engineer (b. 1415)

References